Glee: The Music, The Christmas Album Volume 2 is the tenth soundtrack album by the cast of the American musical television series Glee, released by Columbia Records on November 11, 2011.

Background
The album features twelve Christmas tunes: ten covers and two original songs. The original songs are both written by Adam Anders, Peer Åström and Shelly Peiken: "Extraordinary Merry Christmas" and "Christmas Eve with You". In addition to featuring twelve of the starring characters from the television show's third season (only Dianna Agron, Jane Lynch and Harry Shum Jr. are not listed), all four of the finalists from The Glee Project are featured: Damian McGinty solos on "Blue Christmas", Samuel Larsen is featured with Cory Monteith and Mark Salling on "Santa Claus Is Coming to Town", and runners-up Lindsay Pearce and Alex Newell duet on "Do You Hear What I Hear?"

The album debuted on the Billboard 200 at number six, selling 71,000 copies in its first week.

Reception

Heather Phares of AllMusic gave the album a rating of three-and-a-half stars out of a possible five, and wrote that "listeners know what to expect" and the album "delivers just that". She praised Amber Riley's "All I Want for Christmas Is You" as "charming", Naya Rivera's "Santa Baby" as "mischievous", Heather Morris's "Christmas Wrapping" as "brilliant", and Chris Colfer and Darren Criss for their "brassy, breezy" version of "Let It Snow". She did note that the album "flags" when "unfamiliar" songs are presented and singled out the original song "Extraordinary Merry Christmas" in this regard. She also criticized the final song of the album, "Do They Know It's Christmas?", and described it as "overwrought".

Track listing
Unless otherwise indicated, information is based on the liner notes.

Notes
While Dianna Agron and Jane Lynch are credited as part of the Glee cast vocals in the liner notes, they are not credited on any tracks. 
"Santa Baby" samples the instrumental track of Madonna's cover version
"River" samples the piano track from Joni Mitchell's original version
The musical arrangement of "Santa Claus Is Coming To Town" is based on the Bruce Springsteen cover version

Personnel

Dianna Agron – vocals
Adam Anders – arranger, composer, digital editing, producer, soundtrack producer, vocal arrangement, additional vocals
Alex Anders – digital editing, engineer, vocal producer, additional vocals
Nikki Anders – additional vocals
Peer Åström – arranger, composer, engineer, mixing, producer
Kala Balch – additional vocals
Glen Ballard – composer
Dave Bett – art direction
Joshua Blanchard – assistant engineer
PJ Bloom – music supervisor
Anita Marisa Boriboon – art direction
Ravaughn Brown – additional vocals
Chris Butler – composer
Geoff Bywater – executive in charge of music
Mariah Carey – composer
Deyder Cintron – assistant engineer, digital editing
Chris Colfer – lead vocals
Kamari Copeland – additional vocals
Darren Criss – lead vocals
Tim Davis – vocal contractor, additional vocals
Dante Di Loreto – soundtrack executive producer
Brad Falchuk – soundtrack executive producer
Emily Gomez – additional vocals
Heather Guibert – coordination
Missi Hale – additional vocals
Billy Hayes – composer
Fredrik Jansson – assistant engineer
Joan Javits – composer
Samuel Larsen – lead vocals
Storm Lee – additional vocals
David Loucks – additional vocals
Jane Lynch – vocals
Meaghan Lyons – coordination
Dominick Maita – mastering
Jayma Mays – lead vocals
Damian McGinty – lead vocals
Kevin McHale – lead vocals
Lea Michele – lead vocals
Cory Monteith – lead vocals
Heather Morris – lead vocals
Matthew Morrison – lead vocals
Ryan Murphy – producer, soundtrack producer
Alex Newell – lead vocals
Jeanette Olsson – additional vocals
Lindsay Pearce – lead vocals
Shelly Peiken – composer
Martin Persson – programming
Nicole Ray – production coordination
Amber Riley – lead vocals
Naya Rivera – lead vocals
Mark Salling – lead vocals
Drew Ryan Scott – additional vocals
Onitsha Shaw – additional vocals
Gloria Shayne – composer
Jenny Sinclair – coordination
Jenna Ushkowitz – lead vocals
Windy Wagner – additional vocals

Source: AllMusic

Charts

Weekly charts

Year-end charts

References

2011 Christmas albums
2011 soundtrack albums
Christmas albums by American artists
Christmas albums by Canadian artists
Columbia Records Christmas albums
Columbia Records soundtracks
Glee (TV series) albums
Pop Christmas albums